Ancyloxypha is a genus of skipper butterflies in the subfamily Hesperiinae.

List of species
Listed alphabetically.
 Ancyloxypha arene (Edwards, 1871) – tropical least skipper
 Ancyloxypha aurea (Hayward, 1940)
 Ancyloxypha dryas (Hayward, 1942)
 Ancyloxypha melanoneura (C. & R. Felder, 1867)
 Ancyloxypha nitedula (Burmeister, 1878)
 Ancyloxypha numitor (Fabricius, 1793) – least skipper or least skipperling
 Ancyloxypha ramba (Evans, 1955)

References

 
Butterfly genera
Taxa named by Baron Cajetan von Felder